The 2011 Carisap Tennis Cup was a professional tennis tournament played on clay courts. It was part of the 2011 ATP Challenger Tour. It is the seventh edition of the tournament. It took place in San Benedetto del Tronto, Italy between July 4 and July 10, 2011.

ATP entrants

Seeds

 1 Rankings are as of June 20, 2011.

Other entrants
The following players received wildcards into the singles main draw:
  Steven Diez
  Daniele Giorgini
  Stefano Travaglia
  Filippo Volandri

The following players received entry as a special exempt into the singles main draw:
  Alessandro Giannessi

The following players received entry from the qualifying draw:
  Nikolaus Moser
  Max Raditschnigg
  Janez Semrajc
  Matteo Trevisan

Champions

Men's singles

 Adrian Ungur def.  Stefano Galvani, 7–5, 6–2

Men's doubles

 Alessio di Mauro /  Alessandro Motti def.  Daniele Giorgini /  Stefano Travaglia, 7–6(7–5), 4–6, [10–7]

External links
Official Website
ITF Search 
ATP official site

Carisap Tennis Cup
Clay court tennis tournaments
ATP Challenger San Benedetto